Gerald Tusha (born 5 February 1991 in Tiranë) is an Albanian professional footballer who plays as a left midfielder for FK Vora.

Club career
Tusha made his league debut for Tirana on the opening day of the 2008–2009 season on 24 August 2008 during a match with Vllaznia Shkodër. The 17-year-old midfielder came on for Lek Kcira in the 55th minute of the game. During the 2008–09 season he made 2 league appearances, both of them coming on as a substitute. In total he played 54 minutes of Albanian Superliga football.

In August 2016, Tusha joined Xagħra United of Malta.

After two years in Malta, Tusha signed a one-year contract with Liria Prizren in Kosovo.

Honours

Club
Tirana
 Albanian Superliga: 2008–09
 Albanian Cup: 2010–11, 2011–12
 Albanian Supercup: 2011, 2012

References

External links
 Profile - FSHF

1991 births
Living people
Footballers from Tirana
Albanian footballers
Association football midfielders
KF Tirana players
FK Partizani Tirana players
FK Dinamo Tirana players
KF Adriatiku Mamurrasi players
KF Tërbuni Pukë players
Xagħra United F.C. players
Għajnsielem F.C. players
KF Liria players
FK Vora players
Kategoria Superiore players
Kategoria e Parë players
Football Superleague of Kosovo players
Albanian expatriate footballers
Expatriate footballers in Malta
Albanian expatriate sportspeople in Malta
Expatriate footballers in Kosovo
Albanian expatriate sportspeople in Kosovo